Hans Scherbart (born 16 December 1905; date of death unknown) was a German field hockey player who competed in the 1936 Summer Olympics.

He was a member of the German field hockey team, which won the silver medal. He played three matches as forward.

External links
 
Profile

1905 births
Field hockey players at the 1936 Summer Olympics
German male field hockey players
Olympic field hockey players of Germany
Olympic silver medalists for Germany
Year of death missing
Olympic medalists in field hockey
Medalists at the 1936 Summer Olympics
20th-century German people